Penicillium malacaense is an anamorph species of the genus of Penicillium.

References

Further reading

 

malacaense
Fungi described in 1980